Echinacea atrorubens, called the Topeka purple coneflower, is a North American species of flowering plant in the family Asteraceae. It is native to eastern Kansas, Oklahoma, and eastern Texas in the south-central United States. It is found growing in dry soils around limestone or sandstone outcroppings and prairies.

The stems and foliage are usually hairy with appressed to ascending hairs 1.2 mm long (strigose), rarely some plants are glabrous. The stems are light green or tan and mottled in color.

Flowering occurs in late spring. The flowering "cones" with paleae 9–15 mm long, with the ends red to orange-tipped, usually straight, and prickly-pointed. Ray flower corollas are purple or rarely pink or white. Discs or cones are ovoid to conic and 25–35 wide and 20–40 mm tall. Disc corollas are 4.5–5.5 mm long with lobes greenish to pink or purple. Seed cypselae are tan and 4–5 mm long with faces finely tuberculate, glabrous. This species has 11 chromosomes.

References

atrorubens
Plants described in 1834
Flora of the Great Plains (North America)